Limestone Township is a township in Clarion County, Pennsylvania, United States. The population was 1,877 at the 2020 census, an increase from the figure of 1,858 tabulated in 2010.

Geography
The township is in southeastern Clarion County and is bordered on the east by Jefferson County. The unincorporated community of Limestone is in the western part of the township along Pennsylvania Route 66, in the valley of Piney Creek.

Demographics

As of the census of 2000, there were 1,773 people, 669 households, and 519 families residing in the township.  The population density was 47.1 people per square mile (18.2/km2).  There were 725 housing units at an average density of 19.3/sq mi (7.4/km2).  The racial makeup of the township was 99.61% White, 0.06% African American, 0.11% Asian, and 0.23% from two or more races.

There were 669 households, out of which 36.5% had children under the age of 18 living with them, 69.1% were married couples living together, 4.9% had a female householder with no husband present, and 22.4% were non-families. 18.1% of all households were made up of individuals, and 7.6% had someone living alone who was 65 years of age or older.  The average household size was 2.65 and the average family size was 3.02.

In the township the population was spread out, with 24.8% under the age of 18, 7.8% from 18 to 24, 30.3% from 25 to 44, 25.2% from 45 to 64, and 11.9% who were 65 years of age or older.  The median age was 38 years. For every 100 females there were 104.7 males.  For every 100 females age 18 and over, there were 99.1 males.

The median income for a household in the township was $40,045, and the median income for a family was $45,368. Males had a median income of $30,691 versus $22,022 for females. The per capita income for the township was $18,887.  About 4.2% of families and 6.1% of the population were below the poverty line, including 6.5% of those under age 18 and 4.3% of those age 65 or over.

References

External links
Limestone Township listing at Clarion County Association of Township Officials

Populated places established in 1800
Townships in Clarion County, Pennsylvania